The Malawi national netball team toured South Africa in November 2020 for a three-match series against the South Africa national netball team. The series was won by South Africa, who won all three of the matches.

Squads

Matches

First test

Second test

Third test

References

External links
 Netball South Africa
 Results and overview (Netball Scoop Forum)

2020 in netball
2020 in South African women's sport
2020 in Malawi
International netball competitions hosted by South Africa